Whitehall Lane Winery & Vineyards is a winery located in St. Helena, CA. It is owned and operated by the Leonardini Family. In 2013, they celebrated their 20th year of Family Winemaking in the Napa Valley.

History 

Whitehall Lane Winery was originally started by Art Finklestein and Alan Stein in 1979 on the 25 acre site that had first been planted back in the 1800s. They operated for over a decade before selling the winery to the Leonardini Family who currently operates Whitehall Lane.
The Leonardini family purchased the winery in 1993 and that's when the awards and accolades began rolling in, including three wines in Wine Spectator's Top 100. Whitehall Lane Winery owns 140 acres of vineyards that are located in several Napa Valley AVA's in the area's most fertile growing regions. These vineyards can be found in the Rutherford, St. Helena and Oak Knoll District appellations of Napa Valley.

Wines 

Whitehall Lane Winery produces Cabernet Sauvignon, Merlot, Pinot Noir, Sauvignon Blanc and Chardonnay wines. Whitehall Lane has been nationally recognized for producing world-class wines by Wine Spectator Magazine.
Whitehall Lane was the first winery in the world to seal it's select premium bottles of Cabernet with Vino-Seal enclosures. Vino-Seal is an easy to open - no corkscrew needed glass closure. Vino-Seal(TM) was developed as an alternative to traditional wine stoppers. It provides an ideal seal ensuring the wine retains its purity of flavor and aroma.

See also 

Napa Valley AVA

References

External links 

 Whitehall Lane Winery

Wineries in Napa Valley
Companies based in Napa County, California